The Forgotten Enemy is an EP by Peter Frohmader, released in 1985 by Hasch Platten.

Track listing

Personnel
Adapted from the liner notes of The Forgotten Enemy.
Musicians
 Werner Aldinger – trombone
 Peter Frohmader – electronics, cover art
 Rudi Haunreiter – drums
 Stephan Manus – violin

Release history

References

External links 
 The Forgotten Enemy at Discogs (list of releases)

1985 EPs
Peter Frohmader albums